"Rock Your Body" is a song by American singer-songwriter Justin Timberlake from his debut studio album, Justified (2002). The Neptunes (consisting of Chad Hugo and Pharrell Williams) wrote and produced the song. The song features background vocals by American singer Vanessa Marquez, who was signed to The Neptunes' Star Trak record label at the time. Jive Records released the track on March 17, 2003, as the third single from Justified. Originally intended to be featured on Michael Jackson's tenth studio album Invincible (2001), Jackson rejected the song along with several other tracks, which were instead given to Timberlake for his debut album. It is an uptempo, disco groove, soul infused song containing influences from Jackson and Stevie Wonder.

The song received generally positive reviews, with music critics noting it as a stand-out track, while complimenting its musical elements. "Rock Your Body" topped the Australian Singles Chart. It peaked at number two on the UK Singles Chart and became the third single from Justified to do so, following "Like I Love You" and "Cry Me a River". It also charted at number five on the US Billboard Hot 100. It was certified gold by the Recording Industry Association of America (RIAA) and by the British Phonographic Industry (BPI) for sales of 500,000 and 400,000 copies, respectively.

The accompanying music video for "Rock Your Body", which was directed by Francis Lawrence, features Timberlake with several back-up dancers performing choreography within a multi-color lighted cube. Timberlake performed the song live several times, including the highly controversial performance at the Super Bowl XXXVIII halftime show with R&B singer Janet Jackson, referred to as a "wardrobe malfunction".

Writing and recording
"Rock Your Body" was written by Justin Timberlake and its producers, Chad Hugo and Pharrell Williams. It was recorded at Master Sound Recording Studios and Windmark Recording, both located in Virginia Beach with Andrew Coleman serving as a recording engineer. It was mixed by Serban Ghenea at Windmark Recording, with Daniel Botancourt and Tim Roberts aiding as additional engineers. John Hanes provided additional Pro Tools engineering. All the instrumentation was delivered by Hugo and Williams, with vocal arrangements handled by the latter and Timberlake. Vanessa Marquez provided additional vocals, which were recorded by Eddie Delena at the Record Plant located in Los Angeles. "Rock Your Body" was initially given to Michael Jackson for his tenth and final studio album Invincible (2001), along with several other songs by The Neptunes. Jackson did not want any of the tracks, and so all the material was passed onto Timberlake for his debut album, Justified.

Composition and reception

"Rock Your Body" has a running duration of four minutes and twenty-seven seconds. The uptempo R&B, disco groove, soul infused song contains influences from both Michael Jackson and Stevie Wonder. The song incorporates tinny, "keyboard-set-to-emulate-clavichord" synthesizers of The Neptunes' late 90s productions, overlaid with "keys and a propulsive drum vamp". Timberlake makes use of his falsetto range, and Vanessa Marquez sings the female section. Alex Needham of NME noted the track to contain characteristics from material within Jackson's album Off the Wall (1979).

According to the sheet music published at Musicnotes.com by Sony/ATV Music Publishing, "Rock Your Body" is written in the key of E minor and has a tempo of 104 beats per minute. It follows the chord progression of F/G-G/A-Em, with Justin Timberlake's vocal range spanning from the low note of B3 to the high note of D6. Andy Kellman of AllMusic noted "Rock Your Body" as a stand-out from Justified, as did Jane Stevenson of Jam!, who interpreted its Jackson influence. Giving Justified a negative review, Caroline Sullivan of The Guardian noted "Rock Your Body" as "predictable". Complex Tannis Spenser listed the song as the fifth best Justin Timberlake song, praising its "near perfect sing along chorus" and Timberlake's vocals.

Pitchfork Media listed the song at 23 on their list of the best singles of 2003, with editor Dominique Leone writing "Rock Your Body" is "as fine an approximation of Off the Wall-era MJ as I've ever heard. The pleading falsetto is right on time, immediately preceded by tough talk about grabbing your girl (and a "couple more")-- the drama!"

Chart performance
On the week of March 22, 2003, "Rock Your Body" debuted on the US Billboard Hot 100 at number 61, earning the Hot Shot Debut honor. The following week, the song entered the top 40 at number 37, and in its third week, reached number 28. In its fourth week, the song charted at number 20 on the Hot 100, and in its fifth week, rose further to number 13. Within its sixth week, it moved up two positions to number 11, and reached number 10 the following week. "Rock Your Body" eventually reached its peak at number five, where it remained for one week. The song remained on the Hot 100 for 22 weeks before dropping out. The song topped the US Mainstream Top 40 chart, where it remained for one week. It was less successful on the US Hot R&B/Hip-Hop Songs chart, where it peaked at number 45. On February 5, 2005, the song was certified gold by the Recording Industry Association of America (RIAA), for shipments of 500,000 copies. As of 2018, the song has sold 2 million copies in the country.

Internationally, the song was met with a similar response. "Rock Your Body" debuted on the Australian Singles Chart at number one. It dropped to number three the following week, where it remained in the top ten for six weeks; it stayed on the chart for eleven weeks before dropping out. The song was certified platinum by the Australian Recording Industry Association (ARIA), denoting shipments of 70,000 copies. On the UK Singles Chart, "Rock Your Body" became Timberlake's third consecutive number two hit, following "Like I Love You" and "Cry Me a River". On the New Zealand Singles Chart, "Rock Your Body" achieved its peak on the week of June 22, 2003, its second week on the chart at number four. The song remained on the chart for 20 weeks, and was certified Gold by the Recording Industry Association of New Zealand (RIANZ), for shipments of 7,500 copies.

It charted within the top five on the Danish Singles Chart and Irish Singles Chart, peaking at number three and four, respectively. It peaked at number six on Belgian Singles Chart (Flanders), Finnish Singles Chart and Dutch Singles Chart. "Rock Your Body" was less successful in other territories. It charted within the top 20 on the Belgian Singles Chart (Wallonia), French Singles Chart, Swedish Singles Charts and Norwegian Singles Chart. It charted outside the top 20 on the German Singles Chart, Swiss Singles Chart and Austrian Singles Chart; the latter chart is the song's lowest charting territory, where it peaked at number 56.

Music video

The music video was directed by Francis Lawrence and filmed in February 2003. It opens within a black cube with an array of different colored lights with several people dancing. The video inter-cuts to Justin Timberlake singing to the song. Timberlake then floats to the floor from an opening in the cubic's ceiling, performing choreography with his supporting dancers and singing to the track's first verse. Throughout the video, it inter-cuts to Timberlake dancing by himself, with the sections sometimes featuring the camera panning around Timberlake's face. Entering the second verse, Timberlake is in the cube on his own, manipulating the motion of the cube with his hands, with his legs following the moving platform. Timberlake then returns performing choreography again with his dancers.

Following the second chorus, Timberlake dances with Staci Flood, who lip syncs Vanessa Marquez's section. Timberlake is seen beatboxing. The video ends with the final Timberlake duplicate running the opposite direction.

Live performances
Justin Timberlake performed "Rock Your Body" during his Justified World Tour and the Christina Aguilera conjoint tour Justified & Stripped Tour, both in support of his debut album Justified. Timberlake performed the song live on the sketch comedy show Saturday Night Live in October 2003, where he served as host and musical guest. On February 1, 2004, Timberlake performed the song with pop singer Janet Jackson during her performance at the Super Bowl XXXVIII halftime show. At the moment he sang the lyric "I'll have you naked by the end of this song," the singer ripped off part of Jackson's outfit, momentarily exposing her right breast on live television. Timberlake distanced himself from the controversy while Jackson faced much criticism and backlash. He later commented that "America's harsher on women...[and] unfairly harsh on ethnic people." Timberlake performed the song at the Hollywood Palladium, following his performance at the 55th Annual Grammy Awards on February 10, 2013. He performed "Rock Your Body" in a medley with other of his songs at the 2013 MTV Video Music Awards. In 2016, the singer performed the song along with "Can't Stop the Feeling!" during the interval act of the Eurovision Song Contest 2016 grand finale.

"Rock Your Body" was featured on The Justified World Tour (2003/04), Justified and Stripped Tour (2003), FutureSex/LoveShow (2007), Legends of the Summer (2013) and The 20/20 Experience World Tour (2013/14). He again performed the song during the Super Bowl LII halftime show in 2018, this time abruptly stopping the "have you naked..." line and, after a brief pause, segueing into another song.

Track listings

 European CD single
 "Rock Your Body" (Album Version) — 4:28
 "Rock Your Body" (Sander Kleinenberg's Just in the Radio Edit) — 3:33

 French CD single
 "Rock Your Body" (Album Version) — 4:28
 "Rock Your Body" (Paul Oakenfold Radio Edit) — 3:50
 "Rock Your Body" (Video)

 CD maxi single
 "Rock Your Body" (Album Version) — 4:28
 "Rock Your Body" (Sander Kleinenberg's Just in the Radio Edit) — 3:33
 "Rock Your Body" (Paul Oakenfold Mix) — 5:41
 "Rock Your Body" (Instrumental with Beatbox) — 4:28

 Cassette single
 "Rock Your Body" (Album Version) — 4:28
 "Rock Your Body" (Sander Kleinenberg's Just in the Radio Edit) — 3:33
 "Worthy Of" — 4:09

 12-inch vinyl
 "Rock Your Body" (Album Version) — 4:28
 "Rock Your Body" (Paul Oakenfold Mix) — 5:41
 "Rock Your Body" (Sander Kleinenberg's Just in the Club Mix) — 9:32

Personnel
Credits are adapted from AllMusic and the Justified inlay.

 David Betancourt – assistant engineer
 Andrew Coleman – engineer
 Eddie DeLena – vocal engineer
 Serban Ghenea – mixing
 Ian Green – engineer, programming
 Chaz Harpe – mastering
 Chad Hugo – instrumentation, producer
 Eelke Kalberg – producer
 Sander Kleinenberg – producer, remixing
 S. Molijn – producer
 Paul Oakenfold – remixing
 Herb Powers – mastering
 Tim Roberts – assistant engineer
 Justin Timberlake – primary artist, vocal arrangement, vocals
 Pharrell Williams – instrumentation, producer, vocal arrangement, vocals
 Vanessa Marquez – additional vocals

Charts

Weekly charts

Year-end charts

Certifications

Release history

Cover versions and appearances in other media
 The song was briefly featured in the ninth season of South Park episode "Marjorine".
This song is part of the soundtrack of Just Dance 2022.

See also
 Super Bowl XXXVIII halftime show controversy
 List of number-one singles of 2003 (Australia)

References

External links
 

2002 songs
2003 singles
American disco songs
Justin Timberlake songs
Jive Records singles
Number-one singles in Australia
Song recordings produced by the Neptunes
Music videos directed by Francis Lawrence
Songs written by Justin Timberlake
Songs written by Pharrell Williams
Songs written by Chad Hugo
Songs about dancing